McKay Lake is a lake in Clearwater County, Minnesota, in the United States.

McKay Lake was named for Rev. Stanley A. McKay, who baptized people in this lake in 1891.

See also
List of lakes in Minnesota

References

Lakes of Minnesota
Lakes of Clearwater County, Minnesota